Manchester is a city in Northwest England.  The M4 postcode area is to the northeast of the city centre, and includes part of the Northern Quarter, part of New Islington, and the area of Ancoats.  This postcode area contains 67 listed buildings that are recorded in the National Heritage List for England.  Of these, eight are listed at Grade II*, the middle of the three grades, and the others are at Grade II, the lowest grade.

The prosperity of Manchester was due mainly to the growth of the textile industry in the Industrial Revolution, and the area covered in this list is mainly industrial.  Most of the listed buildings are survivors from this industry, particularly former cotton mills in Ancoats that have been altered and used for other purposes.  Other remnants of this industry, and listed, are houses containing former workshops, and warehouses.  Industry was stimulated by the development of the canal system in the 18th century, and two canals pass through the area, the Rochdale Canal and the Ashton Canal.  The listed buildings associated with these are locks, bridges, a retaining wall, and a lock keeper's cottage.  During the late 19th and early 20th centuries the Cooperative Wholesale Society built large offices and warehouses in the area, and these are listed.  The other listed buildings in the area include houses, shops, public houses, a hotel, churches, market halls, a schoolroom, a women's refuge, a former ragged school. a former fire and police station, a corn exchange, and a bank, many of which have been converted for other uses or are unused.


Key

Buildings

References

Citations

Sources

Lists of listed buildings in Greater Manchester
Buildings and structures in Manchester